Kafé 44 is a café, concert venue, and anarchist bookstore in Stockholm. Based in the Kapsylen work cooperative, which was founded by an artist group in 1976, the café Dagfiket opened in its basement in the early 1980s, and was later followed by the music venue Scen 44 in 1990, and the anarchist bookstore Bokhandeln INFO a few years later.

References

Further reading

External links

 
Kapsylen page

Cultural organizations based in Sweden
Music venues in Sweden
Infoshops
Anarchist communities
Counterculture communities
Buildings and structures in Stockholm
Anarchist bookstores
Coffeehouses and cafés in Sweden